Liebestraum (German for "dream of love") is a 1991 American mystery film written and directed by Mike Figgis and starring Kevin Anderson, Pamela Gidley, Bill Pullman, Zach Grenier, Alicia Witt and Taina Elg, with Kim Novak in her last film role.

Plot
The story follows two affairs, a generation apart. Nick (Kevin Anderson), a professor of architecture in upstate New York, comes to an Illinois town to be with his birth mother (Kim Novak) in the final days of her illness; he was adopted and has never met her before. On the first day, he runs into Paul (Bill Pullman), a college friend, whose construction company is demolishing an old downtown department store where a murder-suicide happened 30 years before. The building is a beautiful cast-iron construction, so Nick wants to study it before the demolition. Paul introduces Nick to his wife, Jane (Pamela Gidley), a photographer who wants to portray the same building. Over the next four days, Nick and Jane's attraction grows, as Nick explores the old building, attends his mother's bedside, and unravels the truth that links both of them with the developing events in his and Jane's life.

Cast

Home media
When Liebestraum made its VHS debut, it was released in two editions — the R-rated theatrical version and an unrated director's cut. The DVD release, part of MGM's Avant-Garde Cinema series, features only the R-rated version. However, the deleted scene that marks the single difference between the two edits is included as a bonus feature on the disc.

References

External links
 
 
 

1991 films
Binghamton, New York
American mystery thriller films
Films directed by Mike Figgis
Initial Entertainment Group films
Metro-Goldwyn-Mayer films
1990s mystery thriller films
Films produced by Eric Fellner
1990s English-language films
1990s American films